The Big Time Summer Tour was the third concert tour and the first official world tour by boy band Big Time Rush. Visiting the Americas, the tour supported the band's second studio album, Elevate and their second official soundtrack, Big Time Movie Soundtrack. The tour began in July 2012 and ended in the following October. It became the second best selling tour according to ticketmaster.com in the summer of 2012 as well.

Background
The tour was announced in February 2012, days before the band commenced their second tour. This tour saw the band performing in amphitheatres during the summer season. Band member Carlos Peña said the tour was "going to be crazy", allowing the band to do a more expansive show with a bigger set.  This also marks the band's first performance in South America, headlining the Z Festival and Teens Live Festival. 
Commenting on the tour, the band stated: "We can't wait to hit the road again. The Better with U Tour has been amazing and we're incredibly grateful to our fans who have supported us and made our first [tour] a success".

Critical reception
The tour received mixed reviews from music critics. The concert at the Mandalay Bay Events Center was enjoyed by everyone in the audience, writes Ron Sylvester (Las Vegas Sun). He continues, "Because the true measure of Big Time Rush won't be about a show on one Saturday night at Mandalay Bay. It will be written in the memories of the screaming girls if they continue to warmly recall those songs as they grow up. And whether they’re willing to buy tickets to hear that music again in Las Vegas showrooms 40 years from now".

Jim Abbott (Orlando Sentinel) called the show at the Amway Center unnatural and formulaic. He explains, "Compared with that free-spirited British group, BTR's stage presence was more contrived, more tightly choreographed even in the moments that were supposed to be spontaneous".

Opening acts
Cody Simpson (North America)
Rachel Crow (North America, select dates)
Leon Thomas III (North America, select dates)
Tyler Medeiros (Canada)
Victoria Duffield (Canada)
New Hollow (Las Vegas)
La Pepa (San Juan)

Setlist
"Elevate"
"Time of Our Life"
"City Is Ours"
"No Idea"
"Love Me Love Me"
"If I Ruled the World"
"Halfway There"
"Invisible"
"Boyfriend"
"Cover Girl"
"Any Kind Of Guy"
"Big Night"
"Worldwide"
"I Want to Hold Your Hand"
"Help!"
"Show Me"
"Music Sounds Better with U"
"Superstar"
"Windows Down"
"Til I Forget About You"
"Big Time Rush"

Shows

Cancelled

Notes

External links
Big Time Rush website

References

2012 concert tours
Big Time Rush concert tours